The Kandy Cricket Club, also known as Kandy CC, is a cricket club based in Kandy, Sri Lanka which plays in divisional cricket tournaments organized by the Kandy District Cricket Association (KDCA)  and Sri Lanka Cricket.

History

Cricket has been played in Kandy since 1863. The first club to play was Kandy Dancing, Boating & Rowing Club. In 1896 it became the Kandy SC. Ceylon’s first unofficial test was played at Bogambara Grounds in 1889. In 1946, the Kandy District Cricket Association and there after the Central Province Cricket Association was formed. During the 1970’s Kandy SC was unable to complete their quota of matches and were suspended which led to some of their keen cricketers forming the Kandy CC.

Current squad

Honours
 Premier Trophy (0) -

Records

Notable people
 

Pradeep Munidasa, 2002–03 season cricketer
N. Rambadagalla, 1992–93 season cricketer

References

External links
 CricInfo profile

Bibliography
 Wisden Cricketers Almanack (annual)

Former senior cricket clubs of Sri Lanka